The 2017 Dwars door Vlaanderen is a road cycling one-day race that took place on 22 March. It was the 72nd edition of the Dwars door Vlaanderen, and the first since it was promoted to World Tour level – as the tenth event of the 2017 UCI World Tour.

The race was won by local rider Yves Lampaert – riding for the  team – who soloed away to the victory after making the race-defining split along with teammate Philippe Gilbert, Alexey Lutsenko from the  team, and 's Luke Durbridge. Lampaert attacked with  remaining and ultimately won the race by 39 seconds ahead of Gilbert, who led home Lutsenko and Durbridge in a sprint for second place.

Teams
As a new event to the UCI World Tour, all UCI WorldTeams were invited to the race, but not obligated to compete in the race. As such, sixteen of the eighteen WorldTeams – all except  and  – competed in the race. Nine UCI Professional Continental teams competed, completing the 25-team peloton.

Route
The race started in Roeselare and followed a  course to finish in Waregem. It began with a long flat section that took the riders generally east from Roeselare and into Waregem; it then left the town and went south. At Avelgem, the course turned back east again to cross the first climb, the Nieuwe Kwaremont, after . This was followed by the climb of the Kattenberg, then the cobbled flat sectors of the Holleweg and the Haaghoek, then the climbs of the Leberg and the Berendries. After the next climb, the Valkenberg, the course turned back west towards the finish, with  remaining. The Eikenberg and the Taaienberg followed soon after, then the combination of the Oude Kwaremont and the Paterberg. After the final flat cobbled sector, the Varentstraat, the course turned north for the final three climbs: the Vossenhol (Tiegemberg), Holstraat and Nokereberg.

Categorised climbs and cobbles

Result

References

External links

2017 UCI World Tour
2017 in Belgian sport
2017
March 2017 sports events in Europe